An extra-parliamentary opposition is a political movement opposed to a ruling government or political party that chooses not to engage in elections. Many social movements could be categorized as an extra-parliamentary opposition.

Europe
The German New Left movement Außerparlamentarische Opposition (APO, Extraparliamentary Opposition) is one of the best known examples of this phenomenon. The APO challenged the grand coalition of the Social Democratic Party and the Christian Democratic Union, which controlled 95 percent of the seats in the Bundestag between 1966 and 1969.

The Italian Far Left movement Lotta Continua (LC - Continuous Struggle) is one of the best known examples of this phenomenon in Italy.

America 
The Argentine center-left Radical Civic Union was an extra-parliamentary opposition from 1904 to 1916, when the first secret and compulsory ballot took place.

See also
Lotta Continua

External links
APO page at Baader-Meinhof.com

Political movements
Political opposition
Westminster system governments
Westminster system
Democracy
Political organizations